Riders of the Dawn is a 1937 American Western film directed by Robert N. Bradbury and starring Jack Randall, Kathryn Keys and Warner Richmond.

Cast
 Jack Randall as Marshal Jack Preston
 Kathryn Keys as Jean Porter 
 Warner Richmond as Jim Danti
 George Cooper as Grizzly Ike
 James Sheridan as Henchman Pinto
 Earl Dwire as Two-Gun Gardner
 Lloyd Ingraham as Dad Moran
 Ed Brady as Henchman Breed
 Ella McKenzie as 	Dance Hall Girl
 Forrest Taylor as Brady 
 Frank Hagney as 	Henchman Butch
 Chief Dark Hawk as Indian Joe

References

Bibliography
James Robert Parish & Michael R. Pitts. Film directors: a guide to their American films. Scarecrow Press, 1974.

External links
 

1937 films
1937 Western (genre) films
1930s English-language films
American Western (genre) films
Films directed by Robert N. Bradbury
Monogram Pictures films
1930s American films